Gert and Daisy Clean Up is a 1942 British comedy film directed by Maclean Rogers and starring Elsie Waters, Doris Waters and Iris Vandeleur.

The film's sets were designed by the art director Andrew Mazzei. It was shot at the Riverside Studios in Hammersmith.

Cast
 Elsie Waters as Gert 
 Doris Waters as Daisy 
 Iris Vandeleur as Ma Butler 
 Elizabeth Hunt as Hettie 
 Toni Edgar-Bruce as Mrs. Wilberforce 
 Joss Ambler as Mr. Perry 
 Ralph Michael as Jack Gregory 
 Uriel Porter as Snow White 
 Harry Herbert as Old Cheerful
 Angela Glynne as Girl
 Arthur Hambling as PC Albert Green
 Johnnie Schofield as Policeman on Night Duty 
 Douglas Stewart as Mayor 
 David Trickett as Boy

References

Bibliography
 Murphy, Robert. Realism and Tinsel: Cinema and Society in Britain 1939-48. Routledge, 1992.

External links

1942 films
British comedy films
British black-and-white films
1942 comedy films
Films shot at Riverside Studios
Films set in London
Butcher's Film Service films
Films directed by Maclean Rogers
Films scored by Percival Mackey
1940s English-language films
1940s British films